Estonia competed at the 2016 Summer Olympics in Rio de Janeiro, Brazil, from 5 to 21 August 2016. It was the nation's seventh consecutive appearance at the Games in the post-Soviet era and twelfth overall in Summer Olympic history.

The Estonian Olympic Committee fielded a team of 45 athletes, 28 men and 17 women, across 13 sports at the Games. It was the nation's second-largest delegation sent to the Olympics, just two athletes short of the record achieved in Beijing 2008 (47). Among the sports represented by its athletes, Estonia marked its Olympic return to triathlon after being absent from London 2012, as well as weightlifting after eight decades. Athletics had the largest team by sport with only 13 competitors, roughly a third of the nation's full roster size. Apart from triathlon and weightlifting, there was also a single competitor each in archery, judo, and shooting.

Fifteen Estonian athletes competed in London, with discus thrower and 2008 champion Gerd Kanter, rowers Tõnu Endrekson and Andrei Jämsä, and épée fencer Nikolai Novosjolov headed to their fourth Games as the most experienced competitors of the team. Sisters and marathon runners Leina, Liina, and Lily Luik set a historic record for Estonia, as the first identical triplets to compete in the same event at the Games. Other notable athletes on the Estonian roster featured Greco-Roman wrestler and 2012 silver medalist Heiki Nabi in the super heavyweight category, and Laser sailor Karl-Martin Rammo, who was selected by the committee as the nation's flag bearer in the opening ceremony.

Estonia left Rio de Janeiro with only a bronze medal. It was awarded to the rowing foursome of Endrekson, Jämsä, and three-time Olympians Allar Raja and Kaspar Taimsoo in the men's quadruple sculls, rebounding from their out-of-medal position at London 2012. Several Estonian athletes advanced further to the finals of their respective sporting events, but came closest to the medal haul, including the women's épée team, discus throwers Kanter and Martin Kupper, hurdler Rasmus Mägi, and Nabi, who could not reproduce his podium feat from London after losing the bronze to Russia's Sergey Semenov.

Medalists

Archery

One Estonian archer qualified for the women's individual recurve at the Olympics by virtue of a top six national finish at the 2016 Archery World Cup meet in Antalya, Turkey.

Athletics

Estonian athletes achieved qualifying standards in the following athletics events (up to a maximum of 3 athletes in each event):

Track & road events
Men

Women

Field events
Men

Women

Combined events – Men's decathlon

Combined events – Women's heptathlon

Badminton

Estonia qualified two badminton players for each of the following events into the Olympic tournament. Remarkably going to his third Olympics, Raul Must had claimed his Olympic spot as one of top 34 individual shuttlers in the BWF World Rankings as of 5 May 2016, while Kati Tolmoff picked up one of the spare athlete berths freed by the Tripartite Commission as the next highest-ranked eligible player in the women's singles.

Cycling

Road
Estonian riders qualified for a maximum of two quota places in the men's Olympic road race by virtue of their top 15 final national ranking in the 2015 UCI Europe Tour.

Fencing

Estonian fencers qualified a full squad in the women's team épée by virtue of their top 4 national finish in the FIE Olympic Team Rankings. Nikolai Novosjolov, who competed at his fourth Olympics, secured a spot in the men's épée as one of the two highest-ranking fencers coming from the Europe zone outside the world's top eight qualifying teams in the FIE Adjusted Official Rankings.

Judo

Estonia qualified one judoka for the men's half-heavyweight category (100 kg) at the Games. Grigori Minaškin earned a continental quota spot from the European region as the highest-ranked Estonian judoka outside of direct qualifying position in the IJF World Ranking List of 30 May 2016.

Rowing

Estonia qualified one boat in the men's quadruple sculls for the Olympics at the 2015 FISA World Championships in Lac d'Aiguebelette, France.

Qualification Legend: FA=Final A (medal); FB=Final B (non-medal); FC=Final C (non-medal); FD=Final D (non-medal); FE=Final E (non-medal); FF=Final F (non-medal); SA/B=Semifinals A/B; SC/D=Semifinals C/D; SE/F=Semifinals E/F; QF=Quarterfinals; R=Repechage

Sailing
 
Estonian sailors qualified one boat in each of the following classes through the 2014 ISAF Sailing World Championships, the individual fleet Worlds, and European qualifying regattas. The women's 49erFX crew was added to the Estonia's sailing line-up, as the nation has received a spare Olympic berth freed up by Australia, Croatia and Austria from the International Sailing Federation.

M = Medal race; EL = Eliminated – did not advance into the medal race

Shooting
 
Estonia received an invitation from ISSF to send European Games finalist Peeter Olesk in both men's air and rapid fire pistol to the Olympics, as long as the minimum qualifying score (MQS) was fulfilled by 31 March 2016.

Qualification Legend: Q = Qualify for the next round; q = Qualify for the bronze medal (shotgun)

Swimming

Estonia received a Universality invitation from FINA to send two swimmers (one male and one female) to the Olympics.

Triathlon

Estonia entered one triathlete to compete at the Games, signifying the nation's Olympic comeback to the sport after an eight-year hiatus. Kaidi Kivioja was selected as the highest-ranked triathlete from Europe in the women's event based on the ITU Points List.

Weightlifting

Estonia qualified one male weightlifter for the Olympics by virtue of his top 15 individual finish, among those who had not secured any quota places through the World or European Championships, in the IWF World Rankings as of 20 June 2016, signifying the nation's Olympic return to the sport for the first time since 1936. The place was awarded to Mart Seim in the men's super heavyweight division (+105 kg).

Wrestling

Estonia qualified three wrestlers for each the following weight classes into the Olympic tournament. One of them had claimed an Olympic spot in the women's freestyle 75 kg at the 2015 World Championships, while two more Olympic berths were awarded to Estonian wrestlers, who progressed to the top two finals each in men's Greco-Roman 98 & 130 kg at the 2016 European Qualification Tournament.

Men's Greco-Roman

Women's freestyle

References

External links 

 

Olympics
2016
Nations at the 2016 Summer Olympics